Sienniczka is a short 1.5-kilometer river of Poland, a tributary of the Gręziniec near Szczecin.

Rivers of Poland
Rivers of West Pomeranian Voivodeship